Lydia Marie Hearst-Shaw (born September 19, 1984) is an American fashion model, actress, socialite, and lifestyle blogger. She is a great-granddaughter of newspaper publisher and politician William Randolph Hearst and a daughter of the author and actress Patty Hearst.

Early life and education 
Hearst-Shaw was born in 1984, the daughter of actress Patty Hearst and Bernard L. Shaw, a former San Francisco police officer. She attended Sacred Heart University in Fairfield, Connecticut until 2003, when she began fashion modeling.

Career

Magazines and fashion shows
Photographer Steven Meisel "discovered" Hearst and shot her first magazine cover for Vogue Italia in April 2004. Since then, she has appeared internationally on a variety of magazine covers such as Vogue, Harper's Bazaar, Elle, Marie Claire, GQ, L'Officiel, and Esquire. She has worked with several well-known photographers such as Meisel, Patrick Demarchelier, Ellen Von Unwerth, Mario Testino, Peter Lindbergh, Inez van Lamsweerde and Vinoodh Matadin.

Hearst has modeled for fashion designers such as Chanel, Fendi, Catherine Malandrino, Nicole Miller, and Jeremy Scott.

Advertising
Hearst has appeared in advertising campaigns for Prada, Louis Vuitton, Alexander McQueen, Bottega Veneta, Sephora, L'Oreal Ferria, DKNY, MYLA Lingerie, H&M, NARS Cosmetics, MAC Cosmetics, Miss Me Jeans, Moschino Cheap & Chic. In 2007, she appeared in Puma's French 77, which led Puma to commission her to design a line of handbags for the collection.

In Spring of 2012, Swarovski chose Hearst to be its ambassador for its Heart Truth campaign, sponsored by the National Heart, Lung and Blood Institute, intended to raise women's awareness about heart health.

Journalism
Hearst was briefly a columnist for Page Six, a feature of the Sunday edition of the New York Post. She also ran a lifestyle and fashion blog.

Other roles
Hearst made an appearance in the music video for the Miles Fisher cover of "This Must Be the Place". Hearst again starred in a music video in 2012 for Cisco Adler's "Song for All the Girls", where she is graphically murdered by a spin saw. She also has a minor role in Johnny Polygon's "LimoSexSuperstar" video.

Reality TV
Hearst served alongside Anne Vyalitsyna and Naomi Campbell as a supermodel coach for the second edition of Oxygen's The Face modeling reality competition. The season premiered on March 5, 2014.

Filmography

Personal life
Hearst married Chris Hardwick on August 20, 2016, in Pasadena, California. In August 2021, they announced they were expecting their first child, and on January 29, 2022, their daughter's birth was announced on Instagram.

Philanthropy
Her family's tradition of philanthropy inspired Hearst to become a Smile Ambassador for Operation Smile.

References

External links

 
 
 

American film actresses
American socialites
American television actresses
Lydia
Lawrenceville School alumni
Living people
Participants in American reality television series
Sacred Heart University alumni
1984 births